Endless Summer or The Endless Summer may refer to:

Film and television 
 The Endless Summer, a 1966 documentary film about surfers directed by Bruce Brown
 The Endless Summer II, a 1994 sequel to the 1966 film
 The Endless Summer Revisited, a 2000 documentary using cast-off footage from the Endless Summer films
 "Endless Summer!", a 1990 episode of The Raccoons
 The Endless Summer (SpongeBob SquarePants short), a short educational film in 2005 featuring SpongeBob SquarePants, about the effects of global warming

Music 
 Endless Summer (Beach Boys album), a 1974 compilation album of early Beach Boys' hits
 Endless Summer: Greatest Hits, a 1994 compilation album of Donna Summer's hits
 Endless Summer (Fennesz album), a 2001 album by Fennesz
 "Endless Summer" (Siria song), a single from Siria, and later a single from Cascada's second album
 "Endless Summer" (Scooter song), a 1995 single from the German dance band Scooter
 The Endless Summer (G-Eazy mixtape), a 2011 mixtape from the American rapper G-Eazy
 "Endless Summer" (Oceana song), a 2012 single from the German pop singer Oceana, and the official UEFA Euro 2012 theme song
 "Endless Summer", a 2011 single by Australian music group The Jezabels
 "Endless Summer", a 2011 single by British music duo Still Corners
Endless Summer, song on Jim Stark's EP, Morning Songs
 Endless Summer, a 2016 album by synthwave band The Midnight
 "Endless Summer", a 2022 single by American indie rock band Superchunk

Science 
 A genetically modified tomato